Bahariyeh or Behariyeh may refer to:
 Bahariyeh, Khuzestan
 Bahariyeh, Markazi
 Bahariyeh, Razavi Khorasan